C.S.Ramachary School is a memorial higher  secondary education centre located in Thirunagar, Madurai. It is well known among the other schools in Madurai district for its 12th grade passing percentage and scores. The school premises consist of classroom blocks, auditorium, basketball court, open play space, trees and canteen. The premise is shared with Sitalakshmi Girls Higher Secondary School.

History 
C.S.R Memorial Matriculation School has been functioning from the academic year 1989-1990 under the auspices of the C. S. Ramachary Educational Trust dedicated to the memory of late Sri C. S. Ramachary, a leading industrialist and philanthropist.

Vision 
The school aims to develop the personality of the child, its ability to think and arouse its curiosity to gather knowledge. The school also aims to create awareness among children about our exalted cultural heritage. A special emphasis is laid on values and great ideas in Hindu Culture and in the exposition of great sages of this land.

Campus 
The school runs in two different campuses:
Main campus is for Std. VI to XII
Primary campus is for Std. Pre-KG till Std.V

Curriculum 
The school is recognized by the Tamil Nadu state government.

The School follows the syllabus recommended by Tamil Nadu Matriculation Board for classes I to X and Tamil Nadu State Board Syllabus for classes XI & XII.

References

Primary schools in Tamil Nadu
High schools and secondary schools in Tamil Nadu
Education in Madurai district
Educational institutions established in 1989
1989 establishments in Tamil Nadu